Geeta Mukherjee (8 January 1924 – 4 March 2000) was an Indian politician and social worker and a four times MLA from Panskura Purba, from 1967 to 1977. As a Member of Parliament, she was elected seven times  from the Panskura constituency, from 1980 to 2000, in the Indian state of West Bengal being a Communist Party of India (CPI) candidate. She also remained the president of National Federation of Indian Women, women's wing of Communist Party of India. She led the demand for the legislature of 1/3rd reservation for women in parliamentary elections in India.

Early life and education
She was born on 8 January 1924 in Calcutta, West Bengal. She was married to Biswanath Mukherjee on 8 November 1942.

Mukherjee completed Bachelor of Arts In Bengali Literature from Ashutosh College, Calcutta. She remained secretary of Bengal Provincial Students Federation from 1947 to 1951.

Career
She was first elected as Member, State Council, Communist Party of India (C.P.I.), Bengal in 1946. Popularly known as Geetadi, Geeta Mukherjee since then won every Lok Sabha election from Panskura in West Bengal, and was in the forefront till her death in 2000.

She was elected to 7th Lok Sabha in 1980 and during 1980–84, she served as
 Member, Committee on Public Undertakings
 Member, Committee on the Welfare of Scheduled Castes and Scheduled Tribes
 Member, Joint Committee on Criminal Law (Amendment) Bill, 1980
Since 1981 onwards, she was the Member of National Executive Council, Communist Party of India.

She was elected to her 7th term during the 13th Lok Sabha in 1999. Her career spanned about five and half decades. However, it was her role in the women's reservation issue which brought her into the limelight. She was also a member of the National Commission on Rural Labour, National Commission on Women, National Children's Board, Press Council and vice-president of the National Federation of Women, besides being a secretariat member of the Women's International Democratic Federation, Berlin.

Besides her political career, she also wrote a few books for children, including Bharat Upakatha (Folktales of India), Chotoder Rabindranath (Tagore for Children)and He Atit Katha Kao; and translated Bruno Apitz's 1958 classic Naked Among Wolves to Bengali.

Death 
Mukherjee died on 4 March 2000, following a massive heart-attack. At the time of death, she was 76 years old. Atal Bihari Vajpayee, the then Prime Minister of India, told in his condolence message— "Mrs. Mukherjee embodied determination and dedication. She was a shining example of women's empowerment. Her life shall remain an inspiration for future generations, especially women."

References

Communist Party of India politicians from West Bengal
Female politicians of the Communist Party of India
1924 births
2000 deaths
Asutosh College alumni
India MPs 1980–1984
India MPs 1984–1989
India MPs 1989–1991
India MPs 1991–1996
India MPs 1996–1997
India MPs 1998–1999
India MPs 1999–2004
Lok Sabha members from West Bengal
Articles created or expanded during Women's History Month (India) - 2014
Women writers from West Bengal
Social workers
20th-century Indian women writers
20th-century Indian novelists
20th-century Indian educational theorists
20th-century Indian women scientists
20th-century Indian social scientists
Women educators from West Bengal
Educators from West Bengal
20th-century Indian women politicians
20th-century Indian politicians
21st-century Indian women politicians
21st-century Indian politicians
People from Purba Medinipur district
Indian children's writers
Social workers from West Bengal
20th-century women educators
Women members of the Lok Sabha
West Bengal MLAs 1967–1969
West Bengal MLAs 1969–1971
West Bengal MLAs 1971–1972
West Bengal MLAs 1972–1977
Women members of the West Bengal Legislative Assembly